"When You Love a Woman" is a song by American rock band Journey. It is the third track from their 10th studio album, Trial by Fire (1996), and was released as the lead single from that album in September 1996.

The song reached number one on the US Billboard Adult Contemporary chart, where it stayed for four weeks, and number 12 on the Billboard Hot 100, finishing 1997 as the 57th-best-selling single in the US and their last major hit there. In Canada, the song peaked at number three on the RPM Top Singles chart and number one on the RPM Adult Contemporary chart. "When You Love a Woman" was nominated for a Grammy Award in the category Best Pop Performance by a Duo or Group.

Music video
The music video features the band playing in what appears to be an empty recording studio. The video was directed by Wayne Isham. This was one of the last performances with Steve Perry as vocalist. In the video, Neal Schon plays a white Tom Anderson guitar.

Charts

Weekly charts

Year-end charts

Certifications

See also
 List of Billboard Adult Contemporary number ones of 1996

References

External links
 

1996 singles
1996 songs
Journey (band) songs
Columbia Records singles
Music videos directed by Wayne Isham
Song recordings produced by Kevin Shirley
Songs written by Jonathan Cain
Songs written by Neal Schon
Songs written by Steve Perry